The 1997–98 OPJHL season is the fifth season of the Ontario Provincial Junior A Hockey League (OPJHL). The twenty-two teams of the MacKenzie, MacKinnon, Phillips, and Ruddock Divisions competed in a 51-game schedule.  The top 4 teams of each division make the playoffs.

The winner of the OPJHL playoffs, the Milton Merchants, won the 1998 Buckland Cup as OHA Champions and the Dudley Hewitt Cup as Central Canadian Champions, but failed to win the 1998 Royal Bank Cup.

Changes
Aurora Tigers join OPJHL from MetJHL.
Orillia Terriers move to Rama, Ontario and become Couchiching Terriers.
Newmarket 87's become Newmarket Hurricanes.
Peterborough Jr. Petes become Peterborough Bees.
St. Michael's Buzzers take leave of absence.

Final standings

Note: GP = Games played; W = Wins; L = Losses; OTL = Overtime losses; SL = Shootout losses; GF = Goals for; GA = Goals against; PTS = Points; x = clinched playoff berth; y = clinched division title; z = clinched conference title

1997-98 OPJHL Playoffs

Division Semi-final
Milton Merchants defeated Mississauga Chargers 4-games-to-none
Hamilton Kiltys defeated Brampton Capitals 4-games-to-1
Bramalea Blues defeated Streetsville Derbys 4-games-to-2
Oakville Blades defeated Burlington Cougars 4-games-to-2
Couchiching Terriers defeated Collingwood Blues 4-games-to-2
Peterborough Bees defeated Kingston Voyageurs 3-games-to-2
Trenton Sting defeated Bowmanville Eagles 4-games-to-1
Newmarket Hurricanes defeated Aurora Tigers 4-games-to-1
Division Final
Milton Merchants defeated Oakville Blades 4-games-to-2
Hamilton Kiltys defeated Bramalea Blues 4-games-to-2
Couchiching Terriers defeated Newmarket Hurricanes 4-games-to-1
Trenton Sting defeated Peterborough Bees 3-games-to-2
Semi-final
Milton Merchants defeated Hamilton Kiltys 4-games-to-none
Trenton Sting defeated Couchiching Terriers 4-games-to-1
Final
Milton Merchants defeated Trenton Sting 4-games-to-none

OHA Buckland Cup Championship
Best-of-7 series
Milton Merchants defeated Wexford Raiders (MetJHL) 4-games-to-1
Milton Merchants 11 - Wexford Raiders 2
Milton Merchants 3 - Wexford Raiders 2 2OT
Milton Merchants 6 - Wexford Raiders 1
Wexford Raiders 4 - Milton Merchants 3 OT
Milton Merchants 6 -  Wexford Raiders 1

Dudley Hewitt Cup Championship
Best-of-7 series
Milton Merchants defeated Rayside-Balfour Sabrecats (NOJHL) 4-games-to-2
Rayside-Balfour Sabrecats 4 - Milton Merchants 1
Milton Merchants 5 - Rayside-Balfour Sabrecats 2
Rayside-Balfour Sabrecats 4 - Milton Merchants 1
Milton Merchants 5 - Rayside-Balfour Sabrecats 4 3OT
Milton Merchants 2 - Rayside-Balfour Sabrecats 1 OT
Milton Merchants 3 - Rayside-Balfour Sabrecats 1

1998 Royal Bank Cup Championship
The 1998 Royal Bank Cup was hosted by the Nanaimo Clippers of Nanaimo, British Columbia.  The Milton Merchants were defeated in the semi-final.

Round Robin
Nanaimo Clippers (BCHL) defeated Milton Merchants 6-2
South Surrey Eagles (BCHL) defeated Milton Merchants  3-0
Milton Merchants defeated Brockville Braves (CJHL) 5-2
Weyburn Red Wings (SJHL) defeated Milton Merchants 6-2

Semi-final
South Surrey Eagles (BCHL) defeated Milton Merchants 6-2

Scoring leaders
Note: GP = Games played; G = Goals; A = Assists; Pts = Points; PIM = Penalty minutes

See also
 1998 Royal Bank Cup
 Dudley Hewitt Cup
 List of OJHL seasons
 Northern Ontario Junior Hockey League
 Superior International Junior Hockey League
 Greater Ontario Junior Hockey League

References

External links
 Official website of the Ontario Junior Hockey League
 Official website of the Canadian Junior Hockey League

Ontario Junior Hockey League seasons
OPJHL